Kim Ye-Ji (born 17 November 1994) is a South Korean rower. She competed in the single sculls race at the 2012 Summer Olympics and placed 1st in Final D and 19th overall. She also competed in the 2016 Summer Olympics.

References

1994 births
Living people
South Korean female rowers
Olympic rowers of South Korea
Rowers at the 2012 Summer Olympics
Rowers at the 2016 Summer Olympics
Rowers at the 2014 Asian Games
Rowers at the 2018 Asian Games
Asian Games medalists in rowing
Asian Games gold medalists for South Korea
Asian Games silver medalists for South Korea
Medalists at the 2014 Asian Games
Medalists at the 2018 Asian Games
20th-century South Korean women
21st-century South Korean women